Office World plc was a chain of British office superstores that ceased trading in 2005 after administration and a company buy-out. 

Office World had a number of competitors, including Staples, Stationery Box and Ryman. They sold both branded products (such as Esselte and Banner) and own-brand products (eg Office Essentials and Office World). 

In 2004, the company was acquired by Staples, who sold off the assets and stock. Office World subsequently became a dormant brand. The Office World brand, assets and stores were sold to Staples UK for the sum of £32.5 million. After the acquisition by Staples, very few Office World stores were converted into Staples due to their proximity to existing Staples stores. Many of the stores were left unoccupied and the final Office World store closed in November 2005.

See also
Migros

References

Office supply companies of the United Kingdom
Defunct retail companies of the United Kingdom
Companies that have entered administration in the United Kingdom
Retail companies disestablished in 2005
British companies disestablished in 2005
Staples Inc.